The Ten Rings is a fictional organization in the Marvel Cinematic Universe (MCU). It is a clandestine criminal organization founded one thousand years ago by the immortal warlord Xu Wenwu and named after his mystical ten rings. An original creation for the MCU, the group's name is an homage to the Mandarin's ten cosmic rings in the Marvel Comics.

It appeared in the films Iron Man (2008), Iron Man 2 (2010), Iron Man 3 (2013), Ant-Man (2015), and Shang-Chi and the Legend of the Ten Rings (2021); as well as the One-Shot All Hail the King (2014) and the miniseries Ms. Marvel (2022). The Ten Rings were later integrated into mainstream Marvel Universe.

Concept and creation
Iron Man's Marvel Comics premiere in Tales of Suspense #39 (cover dated March 1963) was a collaboration between editor and story-plotter Stan Lee, scripter Larry Lieber, story-artist Don Heck, and cover-artist and character-designer Jack Kirby. In his origin story, wealthy industrialist Tony Stark is injured and taken prisoner by hostile forces in war torn Vietnam, but escapes his captors after building and donning a suit of powered armor. Due to the floating timeline of the Marvel Universe, writers have updated the war and locale in which Stark is injured and builds his armor. In the original 1963 story, it was the Vietnam War. In the 1990s, it was updated to be the first Gulf War, and in the 2000s it was updated again to be the war in Afghanistan.

Screenwriter Alfred Gough said in 2007 that he had developed an Iron Man film for New Line Cinema which included the Mandarin as the villain, conceiving the character as a younger Indonesian terrorist who masqueraded as a rich playboy Tony Stark was acquainted with. However, while working on Iron Man (2008), director Jon Favreau omitted the Mandarin in favor of Obadiah Stane as the main antagonist of the film, believing that the character and the fantasy elements of his rings felt unrealistic and were more appropriate for a sequel with an altered tone. Instead, the Mandarin is referenced via the Ten Rings terrorist group in the film, inspired by the Mandarin's ten rings. The Mandarin had originally been envisioned as a rival to Tony Stark with a building of his own right next to Stark Industries, with the Mandarin eventually drilling a hole underneath Stark Industries to steal all of Stark's technology for himself; associate producer Jeremy Latchman described such story as "crazy terrible" and "underwhelming". Favreau felt only in a sequel, with an altered tone, would the fantasy of the Mandarin's rings be appropriate. The decision to push him into the background is comparable to Sauron in The Lord of the Rings, or Palpatine in Star Wars. Due to the Iron Man films' setting of Afghanistan, the Ten Rings is depicted as a Middle Eastern terrorist group; the group's logo consisted of ten interlocking rings adorned with Mongolian script, an easter egg to the Mandarin's claims of being descended from Genghis Khan in the comics. Following complaints from the Mongolian government of the language's usage being linked with terrorism after the release of Iron Man 3 (2013), Marvel issued an apology. Subsequent depictions of the Ten Rings dropped connotations with Middle Eastern terrorism and the organization's members were redesigned to resemble those of a modern clandestine criminal organization.

At Marvel Studios' San Diego Comic-Con panel in July 2019, the film Shang-Chi and the Legend of the Ten Rings (2021) was announced, confirming the return of the Ten Rings. Kevin Feige noted the Ten Rings organization's role throughout the MCU, and said the Mandarin would be introduced in this film with Hong Kong actor Tony Leung cast in the role. The character's real name "Wenwu" was revealed by Feige during Disney Investor Day in December 2019. Due to Leung's casting and the decision to make Shang-Chi the son of the Mandarin rather than Fu Manchu (later renamed Zheng Zu), the Ten Rings were completely redesigned to have an authentic Chinese influence, with its members closely resembling the Si-Fan, the criminal organization that Shang-Chi's father led in the Master of Kung Fu series. The Ten Rings logo was updated from Mongolian script to "inoffensive" Chinese characters that were synonyms for strength or power written in ancient seal script.

Wenwu says that he was also called "Master Khan", a pseudonym used in the main continuity. This is a possible allusion to the idea that Wenwu is Genghis Khan himself. In Iron Man (2008), Raza also mentions the empire of Genghis Khan.

Fictional organization history

Origin

Thousands of years ago, Xu Wenwu finds the Ten Rings, mystical weapons that grant their user immortality and great power. Wenwu amasses an army of warriors, named after his Ten Rings, and conquers many kingdoms and topples governments throughout history. In 1996, Wenwu attempts to invade the mystical realm of Ta Lo, but is stopped and defeated by village's guardian, Ying Li. Wenwu and Li fall in love; forbidden from settling in Ta Lo due to his warlord past, Wenwu takes Li with him to his home in China, where they marry and have two children, Shang-Chi and Xialing. Content with his new life, Wenwu gives up his weapons and deactivates the Ten Rings organization to be with his family. When Li is murdered by the triad Iron Gang, old rivals of the Ten Rings, Wenwu takes up his rings and reactivates the Ten Rings organization, having Shang-Chi trained in martial arts as an assassin by Death Dealer; Xialing is forbidden from training due to her reminding Wenwu too much of Li. When Shang-Chi is 14, Wenwu dispatches him to kill the Iron Gang's leader and avenge Li. Despite his success, Shang-Chi is traumatized by the ordeal and abandons the Ten Rings, with Xialing following afterwards six years later.

Creating Iron Man

In 2010, Obadiah Stane, who had been trafficking Stark Industries weapons to the Ten Rings, hires the Afghanistan cell to attack a US military convoy in the country. Unbeknownst to the Ten Rings, the convoy included a visiting Tony Stark, whom Stane hoped for the Ten Rings to kill to gain control of Stark Industries. The Afghanistan cell captures Stark alive and sends a video message to Stane, demanding more money. Cell leader Raza demands Stark build a Jericho missile in exchange for his freedom. Knowing Raza would not keep his word, Stark and fellow captive Yinsen build a prototype suit of powered armor to aid in their escape. The Ten Rings learn of their plans and attack their workshop; Yinsen sacrifices himself to save Stark, who uses his armor to defeat his captors and destroy their weapons. Despite this setback, the Ten Rings would continue working with Stane, eventually purchasing Jericho missiles to attack multiple villages, including Yinsen's home village of Gulmira. Stark dons a sleeker, more powerful version of his improvised armor suit and flies to Afghanistan, where he saves the villagers from the Ten Rings. Meanwhile, Raza and his men are able to salvage the remains of Stark's prototype suit and meet with Stane. Stane double crosses Raza and has the entire Afghanistan cell killed by his mercenaries, taking the prototype armor for himself.

Shortly after Stark publicly reveals his identity as Iron Man, the Ten Rings help arrange for Ivan Vanko to travel to Monaco to enact his revenge on Stark.

Copycat attacks

In 2012, in an effort to cover up explosions triggered by soldiers subjected to the Extremis program, Aldrich Killian and the think tank Advanced Idea Mechanics (AIM) hire English actor Trevor Slattery to portray Wenwu in propaganda videos that are broadcast to the world where he and the Ten Rings claim credit for the explosions. Possessing limited knowledge of Wenwu's history and basing it only on legends of the man, Killian creates the persona of "the Mandarin" for Slattery, and even uses the title for himself; Slattery is completely oblivious to the true meaning of his actions, believing he is only starring in a movie.

Wenwu is outraged over the appropriation of his image and organization; with Killian dead due to Tony Stark's actions, Wenwu sends Ten Rings agent Jackson Norriss to break Slattery out of prison to be executed. However, Wenwu becomes amused by Slattery's performances and has him imprisoned in his compound as a "court jester" to entertain him and the Ten Rings.

In 2015, when Darren Cross attempts to sell the Yellowjacket and Ant-Man suits, the Ten Rings sends one of their agents as a buyer. The plot is foiled by Scott Lang.

Battle of Ta Lo

In 2024, Wenwu begins hearing Li's voice, telling him she is trapped in Ta Lo. Wenwu sends the Ten Rings to take the pendants that Li had gifted his children, Shang-Chi and Xialing. Razor Fist leads the mission to obtain Shang-Chi's pendant during a bus ride in San Francisco. When that mission was a success, Wenwu sends his men to take Xialing's pendant at her fight club in Macau, which leads to a resulting brawl between Shang-Chi and Xialing against the Ten Rings operatives, led by Razor Fist and Death Dealer. Wenwu breaks up the brawl and takes his children and Shang-Chi's friend Katy to the Ten Rings compound, where he explains Li's predicament and uses her two pendants to create a map that reveals the location and time to enter Ta Lo. After revealing some of his son's history to Katy, Wenwu reveals his plans to destroy the village after freeing Li. He then imprisons his children and Katy when they refuse to go through with his plan. The three later escape the compound with Slattery and his hundun companion Morris to warn Ta Lo of the Ten Rings. Instead of giving chase, Wenwu decides to wait until the planned date to invade Ta Lo.

Wenwu and the Ten Rings arrive in Ta Lo to destroy the seal holding his wife, prompting a battle between the Ten Rings and the village inhabitants. Guided by Li's voice, Wenwu begins breaking the seal holding her in Ta Lo; unbeknownst to him, Wenwu is being manipulated by the Dweller-in-Darkness, who was using Li's voice to trick Wenwu into destroying its seal with his ten rings. Upon discovering that their weapons are useless against the Dweller and his minions with one of these minions killing Death Dealer, the Ten Rings form a truce with the villagers to fight the new threat. Meanwhile, Wenwu eventually realizes his mistake and sacrifices himself to save Shang-Chi from the Dweller by bequeathing him the ten rings, which Shang-Chi uses to destroy the Dweller. After the battle, the surviving Ten Rings members and villagers join to honor the fallen in a paper lantern ceremony. Xialing is advised by Shang-Chi to disband the Ten Rings.

Following Wenwu's death, Xialing goes against Shang-Chi's advice takes up leadership of the Ten Rings which she restructures to include female fighters in the previously all-male organization.

Alternate versions

An alternate version of the Ten Rings appears in the animated series What If...?

Thwarted by Killmonger

In an alternate 2010, Erik "Killmonger" Stevens saves Tony Stark when the Ten Rings attack his military convoy in Afghanistan. Having previously infiltrated the Ten Rings, Killmonger uses his intel from his time within the organization to expose Obadiah Stane's involvement in the attack, leading to his arrest.

Marvel Comics

Following their appearances on the Marvel Cinematic Universe, the Ten Rings organization was incorporated into the Marvel Comics. The organization's existence was teased in Ironheart #1 (November 2018), by writer Eve Ewing, and artists Kevin Libranda, Geoffo and Luciano Vecchio and made their official comic debut in the following issue. Unlike the films, the Ten Rings organization in the comics is unrelated to the Mandarin.

The Ten Rings are a secret society that built their principles around the Wellspring of Power. Ironheart became their first target where she is ambushed by two assassins that were empowered by the Wellspring of Power. They wanted Ironheart to give in to her power only so Ironheart would attack them. They vanish after the fight.

The Ten Rings sends Midnight's Fire to fight Ironheart to see if she was worthy of joining them. During her fight with Midnight's Fire, Ironheart learns that the Ten Tings are a terrorist organization whose ways of covert actions caused some people to believe that they are a myth. Midnight's Fire describes his history with Ironheart and tries to get her to join up with them. She turns him down and their fight continues. The Ten Rings were responsible for getting Councilman Thomas Birch elected as the Governor of Illinois. In order to make himself look good for Birch's election, Midnight's Fire had some children commit crimes. When Ironheart shows up to stop the Ten Rings, Midnight's Fire fought her and is defeated. Then Midnight's Fire and Birch are arrested by the authorities.

The Ten Rings dispatches their operative Eclipse to Chicago so that she can perform a magical rite that would transform its citizens into zombies. Ironheart and Wasp disrupt the ritual at O'Hare International Airport, but Eclipse teleports away.

Ironheart later discovers that her father Demetrius "Riri" Williams had faked his death in a gas station robbery gone wrong and joined the Ten Rings where he somehow developed geokinesis.

Other versions

Secret Wars (2015)
In Secret Wars, the Ten Rings are one of the many martial arts clans that reside in the wuxia-inspired K'un-L'un region of Battleworld. The Ten Rings have the highest authority in K'un-L'un due its master, Emperor Zheng Zu, winning the Thirteen Chambers tournament for almost 100 years. The ruthless Ten Rings are the sworn enemies of the benevolent Iron Fist school and its members have the ability to use ten martial arts techniques based on the Mandarin's rings.

In other media

Television
In the animated series Iron Man: Armored Adventures, Xin Zhang, the show's depiction of the Mandarin and later his stepson and successor as the Mandarin Gene Khan lead the Tong. Tong is a name of a type of criminal organization of Chinese immigrants in the United States.

Board games
In the Secret Wars Volume 2 for Legendary: A Marvel Deck Building Game, there is an adaptation of Battleworld version of Zheng Zu as Emperor of K'un-Lun and the Ten Rings school, the emperor's name is spelled Zheng Zhu.

References

External links
 
 
 Ten Rings at the Marvel Cinematic Universe Wiki
 Ten Rings at Comic Vine

Comic book terrorist organizations
Fictional cults
Fictional gangs
Fictional organized crime groups
Fictional organizations in Marvel Comics
Fictional secret societies
Iron Man (film series)
Marvel Cinematic Universe features
Marvel Comics supervillain teams
Shang-Chi and the Legend of the Ten Rings
Fictional elements introduced in 2008